Neolepadidae is a family of crustaceans belonging to the order Scalpellomorpha.

Genera:
 Ashinkailepas Yamaguchi, Newman & Hashimoto, 2004
 Leucolepas Southward & Jones, 2003
 Neolepas Newman, 1979
 † Stipilepas Carriol, 2016 
 Vulcanolepas Southward & Jones, 2003

References

Maxillopoda
Crustacean families